Warren Weinstein (July 3, 1941 – January 15, 2015) was an American contractor, and director in Pakistan for J.E. Austin Associates, a firm which increases business competitiveness and growth in developing economies.
He was kidnapped by eight al-Qaeda members on August 13, 2011, in Lahore, Pakistan. He was killed in a January 2015 US drone strike on the Afghanistan-Pakistan border, as announced by U.S. President Barack Obama at a White House press conference on April 23, 2015.

Life
He earned an MA in international relations, and a PhD degree in international law and economics, from Columbia University.
In the 1970s, he was a professor in the political science department at the State University of New York at Oswego, leaving in 1979 to work on economic development with USAID. In the 1980s, he was  the Peace Corps director in Togo.

At the time of his kidnapping, Weinstein was living in Lahore, Pakistan and working as a Country Director of Operations for the Virginia-based development company J.E. Austin Associates. His work reportedly involved supervising a four-year $11-million "competitiveness project", funded by the American government, which was involved in dairy, horticulture, furniture and medical equipment projects. He spoke six foreign languages and had 25 years of experience in international development projects.

Eight armed kidnappers arrived at his house on the morning of August 13, 2011, just when his guards were having food and starting their Ramadan fasting. According to one of them, the kidnappers knocked and when he opened the door, he saw three men standing; they offered meals to him and when he politely refused, five more men stormed the house from the back door and overpowered all the guards, tying their hands behind their backs. They then made Weinstein's driver knock on his bedroom door, and grabbed Weinstein when he opened it.

Kidnapping for ransom is common.
Three guards and his driver were being held.
On November 1, 2011, arrests were made in the case.
On December 1, 2011, al-Qaeda leader Ayman al-Zawahiri claimed to be holding him.

In January 2012, he was reported held in North Waziristan, by Lashkar-e-Jhangvi.

In May 2012, al-Qaeda released a proof-of-life video of Weinstein. Two more followed that September, and a fourth was released in December 2013.

Death
On January 15, 2015, Weinstein was killed in one of a series of unmanned aircraft strikes in Waziristan, Pakistan, along with an Italian hostage, Giovanni Lo Porto, and American al Qaeda operatives Ahmed Farouq and Adam Gadahn, the White House announced on April 23, 2015. The White House claimed it was unaware that any of the victims were present at the sites targeted. They were killed by a "signature strike", one that is launched based on behavioural evidence around a site suggesting a high-value target is inside, without knowing who is actually inside.

Following the announcement, his wife, Elaine, called the government's assistance during Weinstein's years in captivity "inconsistent and disappointing",  echoing criticism similar to that expressed by the parents of other killed prisoners, including James Foley and Kayla Mueller. "We hope that my husband’s death and the others who have faced similar tragedies in recent months will finally prompt the U.S. Government to take its responsibilities seriously and establish a coordinated and consistent approach to supporting hostages and their families," she said in a media statement.

Works
Warren Weinstein, John J. Grotpeter, The pattern of African decolonization: a new interpretation, Program of Eastern African Studies, Syracuse University, 1973, 
Chinese and Soviet aid to Africa, Praeger Publishers, 1975, 
Warren Weinstein, Robert A. Schrire, Political conflict and ethnic strategies: a case study of Burundi, Maxwell School of Citizenship and Public Affairs, Syracuse University, 1976
Soviet and Chinese aid to African nations, Praeger, 1980, 
A sea of troubles: decolonization in Burundi, 1958-1962, University Microfilms International, 1985
Ellen K. Eggers, Warren Weinstein, Historical dictionary of Burundi, Scarecrow Press, 1997,

See also
Foreign hostages in Pakistan
List of kidnappings
List of solved missing person cases

References

External links

http://articles.cnn.com/2011-08-13/world/pakistan.kidnapping_1_security-guards-lahore-police-embassy?_s=PM:WORLD
http://articles.cnn.com/2011-08-23/world/pakistan.american.kidnapped_1_security-guards-senior-lahore-police-kidnapping?_s=PM:WORLD
MSNBC

1941 births
2010s missing person cases
2015 deaths
Accidental deaths in Pakistan
American expatriates in Pakistan
American people of Jewish descent
American people taken hostage
Columbia University alumni
Deaths by United States drone strikes in Pakistan
Foreign hostages in Pakistan
Male murder victims
Missing person cases in Pakistan
Terrorism deaths in Pakistan
Victims of Islamic terrorism